Sweet Hall is a historic residence in Sweet Hall, Virginia, United States, that is listed on the National Register of Historic Places.

Description
The house was built about 1720, and is a 1 1/2-story, asymmetrical "T"-shaped brick dwelling.  The front facade is five bays wide and the house is topped by a rare upper cruck, or curved-principal, gable roof with dormers.

It was listed on the National Register of Historic Places November 7, 1977.

See also

 National Register of Historic Places listings in King William County, Virginia
 Windsor Shades

References

External links

 Sweet Hall, Pamunkey River, Johnson Landing, King William County, VA at the Historic American Buildings Survey (HABS)

Houses on the National Register of Historic Places in Virginia
Houses completed in 1720
Houses in King William County, Virginia
National Register of Historic Places in King William County, Virginia
Historic American Buildings Survey in Virginia
1720 establishments in Virginia